Marsel may refer to:

Marsel Çaka (born 1995), Albanian footballer
Marsel Efroimski (born 1995), Israeli chess player
Marsel Ibragimov (born 1997), Russian professional ice hockey player
Marsel Idiatullin (born 1977), Uzbek professional footballer and coach
Marsel İlhan (born 1987), Turkish professional tennis player
Marsel Islamkulov (born 1994), Kazakhstani-Kyrgyzstani footballer
Marsel Ismailgeci (born 2000), Albanian professional footballer
Marsel Kararbo (born 1994), Indonesian professional footballer
Marsel Markulin (1936–2009), Croatian gymnast
Marsel van Oosten, Dutch photographer of nature and wildlife
Marsel Rushani (born 1986), Albanian football player
Marsel Tenter (born 1969), Romanian basketball coach
Marsel Tukhvatullin (born 1974), Russian football player

See also
Marcel (disambiguation)